A Promise to Burn is the second studio album by American alternative rock band Framing Hanley, released on May 25, 2010. The album also contains a DVD showing the behind the scenes making of the record. The album debuted at #57 on the Billboard 200 chart.

Track listing
 "Intro" – 1:07
 "The Promise" – 3:46
 "Wake Up" – 3:58
 "Bittersweet Sundown" – 3:31
 "WarZone" – 3:47
 "You Stupid Girl" – 3:34
 "Weight of the World" – 3:34
 "Fool with Dreams" – 4:01
 "Back to Go Again" – 3:19
 "Livin' So Divine" – 3:37
 "You" – 3:26
 "Photographs and Gasoline" – 5:43
 "The Burn" – 5:04
iTunes deluxe edition
 "Can Always Quit Tomorrow" – 3:32
 "Pretty Faces" – 3:42

References

2010 albums
Framing Hanley albums